Runaway Island is a 2015 romantic drama film directed by Dianne Houston, written by Christopher Brandt, and starring Lorraine Toussaint, Aisha Hinds and Thomas Q. Jones. It tells the story of senator's widow Naomi Holloway (played by Toussaint), who comes to risk a second chance at love with a younger man.

Runaway Island was filmed during spring of 2015. It premiered at the American Black Film Festival in June, 2015.

Cast
Lorraine Toussaint as Naomi Holloway
Aisha Hinds as Lara Cook-Nordholm
Thomas Q. Jones as Raphael Burrows
Erica Tazel as Vonda Hines
A. Russell Andrews as Rev. Clinton Hines
Leon Thomas III as Evan Holloway
Tom Wright as Raymond Tepper
Melanie Liburd as Kira Geoffries

See also
List of black films of the 2010s

References

External links
 

2015 films
American romantic drama films
2010s English-language films
2010s American films